Daniel Nestor and Édouard Roger-Vasselin were the defending champions but chose not to participate together. Nestor played alongside Dominic Inglot, but lost in the first round to Santiago González and Julio Peralta. Roger-Vasselin teamed up with Fabrice Martin, but lost in the quarterfinals to Wesley Koolhof and Artem Sitak.

Scott Lipsky and Divij Sharan won the title, defeating González and Peralta in the final, 6–4, 2–6, [10–5].

Seeds

Draw

Draw

References
 Main Draw

European Open - Doubles
2017 Doubles